Corymbia arnhemensis, commonly known as the Katherine Gorge bloodwood, is a species of slender tree that is endemic to the Top End of the Northern Territory. It has rough bark on some or all of the trunk, sometimes the larger branches, smooth bark above, lance-shaped to curved adult leaves, flower buds in groups of seven, white flowers and urn-shaped fruit.

Description
It has rough grey to grey brown, tessellated bark on part or all of the trunk, sometimes also the larger branches, and smooth white to grey or pinkish bark above.

Flowering has been observed in November and from February to April and the flowers are white.

Taxonomy and naming
The Katherine Gorge bloodwood was first formally described in 1985 by Denis Carr and Stella Carr from specimens collected near Oenpelli (present day Gunbalanya) by Raymond Specht in 1948, and was given the name Eucalyptus arnhemensis. In 1995 Ken Hill and Lawrie Johnson changed the name to Corymbia arnhemensis. The specific epithet (arnhemensis) refers to the occurrence of this species in Arnhem Land.

Distribution and habitat
Corymbia arnhemensis is endemic to the Top End of the Northern Territory between Jabiluka and Katherine Gorge in Nitmiluk National Park, and grows among sandstone rocks, usually on escarpments and on ridges in shallow sandy soil.

See also
List of Corymbia species

References

arenaria
Myrtales of Australia
Flora of the Northern Territory
Plants described in 1985
Taxa named by Maisie Carr